Kwabotwe is a hill in Ghana. It is the location of Mfantsipim, the oldest secondary schools in Ghana.

References

Landforms of Ghana
History of Ghana
Hills of Africa
Cape Coast